Edvinas Pechovskis (born 25 December 1999), known professionally as Dynoro, is a Lithuanian DJ and music producer. He is best known for his international hit "In My Mind", which interpolates the hook from "L'amour toujours" by Italian DJ Gigi D'Agostino. 
In 2019, his remix of the "Rockstar" song with Ilkay Senkan gained wide popularity.

Dynoro started releasing tracks and remixes on SoundCloud and Spotify in 2013, gaining fame in Lithuania thanks to the YouTube channel and record label "Lithuania HQ". In December 2017, his song "In My Mind" was released. It was a mashup of the 2012 song of the same name by Ivan Gough, Feenixpawl and Georgi Kay and Gigi D'Agostino's single "L'amour toujours" from 2000. The song got a lot of attention all over Europe. Due to copyright reasons, the single was taken down from the stores and was re-released in June 2018 with Gigi D'Agostino added as featuring artist. The new version was released on B1 Recordings, a joint venture with Sony Music. In July 2018, the song reached number one in the German music charts. It was also a number 1 hit in the Czech Republic, Finland, Hungary, Slovakia, Sweden, Switzerland, Latvia, Norway and a top 5 hit in Belgium, Ireland, the Netherlands, the UK, Romania, Poland and Ukraine.

Discography
Charting singles

Other releases
2017: "Love Me"
2017: "Dreaming"
2017: "Tau Taip Atrodo" (with 8 Kambarys)
2018: "In My Mind"
2018: "Hangover"
2019: "Rockstar" (with Ilkay Sencan)
2019: "Obsessed " (with Ina Wroldsen)
2019: "On & On" (with Alok)
2020: "Zver"
2020: "Me Provocas" (with Fumaratto)
2020: "Elektro" (with Outwork featuring Mr. Gee)
2021: "Monsters" (featuring 24kGoldn)
2021: "Swimming In Your Eyes"
2022: "Wildfire"

Remixes
 2017: Dwin – "Bye Bye Boy" 
 2017: 8 Kambarys featuring Sil – "Einu Iš Proto"
 2017: Jovani – "Miami Dream"
 2017: Антоха MC and BMB – "Это лето"

Notes

References

External links
Dynoro on Facebook

Lithuanian record producers
Club DJs
Remixers
Living people
Musicians from Vilnius
1999 births